Mykel Board (born January 31, 1950) is an American journalist, musician, and writer of English-language haiku.

Bibliography

 Even A Daughter Is Better Than Nothing Garrett Country Press (2005) 
 I A, Me-ist Hope and Nonthings Press (2005) 
 Threat By Example ed. by Martin Sprouse Pressure Drop Press 1989 includes essay by Board
 Bisexual Politics: Theories, Queries, and Visions ed. by Naomi Tucker Hayworth Press 1965 Board's essay "Pimple No More"
 Good Advice for Young Trendy People of All Ages ed. Jennifer Blowdryer, Manic D Press 2005 Board's essay "The Joy of Debt"
 Haiku for Lovers ed. Manu Bazzano, MQ Publication London, 2003 1 haiku
 The Haiku Anthology ed. Cor van den Heuval, Norton 1999, 3 haiku

External links
 

1950 births
American male journalists
English-language haiku poets
Living people
Punk people
Beloit College alumni
American male poets